John Edward was a Scottish professional football half-back who played for Aberdeen and Southampton.

References

External links
AFC Heritage profile

Association football midfielders
Aberdeen F.C. players
Southampton F.C. players
Scottish Football League players
Year of birth missing
Year of death missing
Scottish footballers